Cher Ndour (born 27 July 2004) is an Italian professional footballer who plays as a midfielder for Portuguese side Benfica B in the Liga Portugal 2.

Club career
Ndour began his football training at the youth academy of ASD San Giacomo, before moving to the youth academy of Brescia, before moving to the youth academy of Atalanta at the age of 9. On 31 July 2020, he transferred to Benfica. He made his professional debut with Benfica B in a 2–0 Liga Portugal 2 win over U.D. Oliveirense on 2 May 2021, coming in as a sub in the 91st minute replacing Gonçalo Ramos. At 16 years and 279, Ndour is the youngest ever debutant for Benfica B, taking the record from João Félix. At 18 years he made his first appearance for Benfica senior team on 18 March 2023 in a home victory of 5-1 against Vitória SC.

International career
Ndour was born in Italy to a Senegalese father and Italian mother. He is a youth international for Italy, having represented the Italy U15s and Italy U16s.

Honours
Benfica
Campeonato Nacional de Juniores: 2021–22
 UEFA Youth League: 2021–22
Under-20 Intercontinental Cup: 2022

References

External links

 
 
 FIGC U15 Profile
 FIGC U16 Profile

2004 births
Living people
Footballers from Brescia
Italian footballers
Italy youth international footballers
Italian people of Senegalese descent
Italian sportspeople of African descent
Association football midfielders
S.L. Benfica B players
S.L. Benfica footballers
Liga Portugal 2 players
Primeira Liga players
Italian expatriate footballers
Expatriate footballers in Portugal
Italian expatriate sportspeople in Portugal